Koohenjan or Kuhanjan or Kuhenjan or Koohanjan may refer to:
 Koohenjan, Sarvestan
 Kuhenjan District, in Sarvestan County
 Kuhenjan Rural District, in Sarvestan County